Iole is a genus of songbirds in the bulbul family, Pycnonotidae. They are native to tropical eastern Asia, from India to China and south through Southeast Asia to northern Indonesia.

Taxonomy and systematics
While some older sources merge this genus into Hypsipetes, this is neither advisable nor technically correct. The two genera stand well apart, and to phylogenetically justify their merging, the entire "Hypsipetes group" of bulbuls would need to be united in a single genus. That would include Hemixos, Ixos, Microscelis and Tricholestes, and probably also Alophoixus and the monotypic Setornis. The hook-billed bulbul may in fact be the closest living relative to the species in Iole, but altogether the present genus may well be a quite basal lineage of the traditional "Hypsipetes group" of bulbuls, with no particularly close relatives among any of these other genera.

According to mtDNA NADH dehydrogenase subunits 2 and 3 and nDNA β-fibrinogen intron 7 sequence data Alophoixus is only slightly more distant from Hypsipetes than Iole is, whereas mtDNA 12S rRNA and 16S rRNA sequence data places it actually closer to Hypsipetes than to Iole. As the genus name Ixos pre-dates Hypsipetes, it would thus apply to such a thoroughly merged "wastebin taxon".

Extant species
The following seven species are currently recognized:
 Finsch's bulbul (Iole finschii; formerly Alophoixus finschii) 
 Sulphur-bellied bulbul (Iole palawanensis)
 Olive bulbul (Iole viridescens)
 Buff-vented bulbul (Iole crypta)
 Charlotte's bulbul (Iole charlottae)
 Cachar bulbul (Iole cacharensis)
 Grey-eyed bulbul (Iole propinqua)

Former species
Formerly, some authorities also considered the following species (or subspecies) as species within the genus Iole:
 Yellow-browed bulbul (as Iole indica)
 Yellow-browed bulbul (icterica) (as Iole icterica)
 Cinereous bulbul (as Iole cinerea)
 Mindoro bulbul (as Iole Mindorensis)
 Visayan bulbul (as Iole Guimarasensis)
 Zamboanga bulbul (as Iole rufigularis)
 Streak-breasted bulbul (as Iole siquijorensis)
 Romblon bulbul (as Iole cinereiceps)
 Cebu bulbul (as Iole monticola)

Footnotes

References
 Gregory, Steven M. (2000): Nomenclature of the Hypsipetes Bulbuls (Pycnonotidae). Forktail 16: 164–166. PDF fulltext
 Moyle, Robert G. & Marks, Ben D. (2006): Phylogenetic relationships of the bulbuls (Aves: Pycnonotidae) based on mitochondrial and nuclear DNA sequence data. Mol. Phylogenet. Evol. 40(3): 687–695.  (HTML abstract)
 Pasquet, Éric; Han, Lian-Xian; Khobkhet, Obhas & Cibois, Alice (2001): Towards a molecular systematics of the genus Criniger, and a preliminary phylogeny of the bulbuls (Aves, Passeriformes, Pycnonotidae). Zoosystema 23(4): 857–863. PDF fulltext

 
Bird genera
Bulbuls
Taxa named by Edward Blyth